Chaperone-assisted selective autophagy is a cellular process for the selective, ubiquitin-dependent degradation of chaperone-bound proteins in lysosomes.

Autophagy (Greek: ‘self-eating’) was initially identified as a catabolic process for the unselective degradation of cellular content in lysosomes under starvation conditions. However, autophagy also comprises selective degradation pathways, which depend on ubiquitin conjugation to initiate sorting to lysosomes. In the case of chaperone-assisted selective autophagy, dysfunctional, nonnative proteins are recognized by molecular chaperones and become ubiquitinated by chaperone-associated ubiquitin ligases. The ubiquitinated proteins are enclosed in autophagosomes, which eventually fuse with lysosomes, leading to the degradation of the dysfunctional proteins. Chaperone-assisted selective autophagy is a vital part of the cellular protein quality control system. It is essential for protein homeostasis (proteostasis) in neurons and in mechanically strained cells and tissues such as skeletal muscle, heart and lung.

Components and mechanism
The chaperone-assisted selective autophagy complex comprises the molecular chaperones HSPA8 and HSPB8, and the cochaperones BAG3 and STUB1. BAG3 facilitates the cooperation of HSPA8 and HSPB8 during the recognition of nonnative client proteins. STUB1 mediates the ubiquitination of the chaperone-bound client, which induces the recruitment of the autophagic ubiquitin adaptor SQSTM1. The adaptor simultaneously interacts with the ubiquitinated client and autophagosome membrane precursors, thereby inducing the autophagic engulfment of the client. Autophagosome formation during chaperone-assisted selective autophagy depends on an interaction of BAG3 with SYNPO2, which triggers the cooperation with a VPS18-containing protein complex that mediates the fusion of autophagosome membrane precursors. The formed autophagosomes finally fuse with lysosomes, resulting in client degradation.

Clients and physiological role
Proteins that are degraded by chaperone-assisted selective autophagy include pathogenic forms of the Huntingtin protein, which cause Huntington's disease. Furthermore, the expression of the cochaperone BAG3 is upregulated in aged neuronal cells, which correlates with an increased necessity to dispose oxidatively damaged proteins through autophagy. Chaperone-assisted selective autophagy is thus essential for proteostasis in neurons.

In mechanically strained cells and tissues, chaperone-assisted selective autophagy mediates the degradation of the actin-crosslinking protein filamin. Mechanical tension results in unfolding of filamin, leading to recognition by the chaperone complex and to the autophagic degradation of damaged filamin. This is a prerequisite for the maintenance of the actin cytoskeleton in mechanically strained cells and tissues. Impairment of chaperone-assisted selective autophagy in patients and animal models causes muscle dystrophy and cardiomyopathy.

References

Cell biology